The BSFA Awards are given every year by the British Science Fiction Association. The Best Non-Fiction award is open to any written work about science fiction or fantasy which appeared in its current form in the previous year. Whole collections of work that has been published elsewhere previously are ineligible as is work published by the BSFA.

Winners and Shortlists

The ceremonies are named after the year that the eligible works were published, despite the awards being given out in the next year.

  *   Winners and joint winners

External links
 Official website

References

Non-fiction
Awards established in 2001
2001 establishments in the United Kingdom
British non-fiction literary awards